In geometry,  the orthobifastigium (digonal orthobicupola), is formed by gluing together two triangular prisms on their square faces, but without twisting. With regular faces, it has coplanar faces, so it is a limiting case of a Johnson solid. More generally the square can be isosceles trapezoids. 

It is topologically a self-dual polyhedron and can also be called an elongated octahedron and self-dual octahedron. 

These polyhedra resemble the dual gyrobifastigium in that both shapes have eight vertices and eight faces, with the faces forming a belt of four quadrilaterals separating two pairs of triangles from each other. However, in the dual gyrobifastigium the two pairs of triangles are twisted with respect to each other while in the orthobifastigium they are not.

Regular-faced
It can be made with regular faces, squares and triangles, but the triangles will be coplanar.

See also
 Elongated octahedron

References

External links

Space-filling polyhedra